The second season of the science fiction television series The X-Files commenced airing on the Fox network in the United States on September 16, 1994, concluded on the same channel on May 19, 1995, after airing all 25 episodes. The series follows Federal Bureau of Investigation special agents Fox Mulder and Dana Scully, portrayed by David Duchovny and Gillian Anderson respectively, who investigate paranormal or supernatural cases, known as X-Files by the FBI.

The second season of The X-Files takes place after the closure of the department following the events of the first season finale. In addition to stand-alone "Monster-of-the-Week" episodes, several episodes also furthered the alien conspiracy mythology that had begun to form. Season two introduced several recurring characters—X (Steven Williams), an informant to Mulder; Alex Krycek (Nicholas Lea), Mulder's partner-turned-enemy; and the Alien Bounty Hunter (Brian Thompson), a shape-shifting assassin.

The storylines were widely affected by the pregnancy of actress Gillian Anderson; it was decided that Scully would be kidnapped and abducted by aliens, explaining her absence and allowing her to appear comatose two episodes later, which ultimately added more intricacies to the mythology. The season earned seven Primetime Emmy Award nominations. The premiere "Little Green Men", debuted with a Nielsen household rating of 10.3 and was viewed by 9.8 million households, marking a noticeable increase in viewership since the previous year. The series rose from number 111 to number 63 for the 1994–95 television year. In addition, the show's second season has generally received positive reviews from television critics.

Plot overview 

Dana Scully (Gillian Anderson) is reassigned to teach at the FBI Academy while Fox Mulder (David Duchovny) is given lowly surveillance assignments. After he investigates extraterrestrial cases at the Arecibo Observatory in Puerto Rico, Mulder is given a new partner, Alex Krycek (Nicholas Lea), and meets a secretive informant, X (Steven Williams). Mulder is recruited to assist in a hostage negotiation when Duane Barry, an alien abductee, captures four people. Barry eventually kidnaps Scully, believing that if he brings her to his original abduction site, Skyland Mountain, aliens will take her instead of him. Mulder follows but is delayed by Krycek, who is revealed to be a mole working for Cigarette Smoking Man (William B. Davis). When Mulder reaches Skyland Mountain, Scully is gone. Barry, who insists that aliens took him, dies soon after an interrogation by Krycek. When Krycek vanishes, Skinner re-opens the X-Files, claiming that is what the conspirators will fear most.

Scully turns up comatose in a hospital four weeks later with no explanation about how she got there. X provides Mulder with information allowing him to take revenge on her captors, but Mulder is instead convinced by Scully's sister Melissa to visit her bedside. Scully recovers and returns to work shortly thereafter. The agents later investigate a case involving alien biology being injected into teenagers in Wisconsin, and once again they encounter Deep Throat's killer, who is killed by the local sheriff.

When investigating a case involving the murder of identical doctors, the agents come across a shapeshifting Alien Bounty Hunter (Brian Thompson) responsible for executing a series of alien clones. During this case a grown woman claiming to be Mulder's sister Samantha appears, telling Mulder of the Bounty Hunter's objectives and that she has the ability to identify him. When Scully is kidnapped by the Bounty Hunter, Mulder is forced to trade Samantha for her. During a botched attempt to kill the Bounty Hunter, Samantha is killed. However, it is discovered that this was simply one of many alien clones of Samantha. With the help of X, Mulder pursues the Bounty Hunter to a submarine in the Arctic. Mulder is nearly killed when exposed to the Bounty Hunter's toxic blood, but is saved by Scully.

When a hacker downloads decades' worth of classified information about aliens onto a digital tape, he gives it to Mulder, who finds that the entire tape is written in Navajo. Cigarette Smoking Man begins searching for the tape and visits Mulder's father, who calls Mulder to see him shortly afterwards. Before he can reveal anything to Mulder, however, he is murdered by Alex Krycek. Scully brings Mulder to New Mexico, where she introduces him to Albert Hosteen, a code-talker who can translate the digital tape. Albert's grandson shows Mulder a boxcar filled with alien corpses. Cigarette Smoking Man tracks Mulder's location, however, and orders the boxcar burned.

Production

Writing and development 

The season premiere was originally supposed to have been written by series creator Chris Carter. In his initial pitch, Mulder would have been sent  to Moscow. In fact, the producers wanted to film the episode in Russia, but they were not able to secure the appropriate arrangements. In the end, Carter was unable to complete the script idea, which would have also featured the reopening of the X-Files. Instead, co-executive producers Glen Morgan, James Wong and Howard Gordon penned the opening premiere, "Little Green Men"; the episode was the first entry to actually show an alien in the series. This delay gave Carter time to write "Duane Barry", the start of the series' first two-parter.

As the series ended its first season, a problem had arisen for the producers: the pregnancy of Gillian Anderson, who played Dana Scully. Some network executives wanted the role recast, which Carter refused to do. Though they considered having Scully giving birth to an alien child, the producers decided to work around Anderson's pregnancy by having her abducted and appearing comatose several episodes later. This was described by executive producer Frank Spotnitz as "the best thing that ever happened to the series" as it helped form the intricate mythology that would run throughout the show. The writers decided to close the X-Files at the end of the first season and thus separate Mulder and Scully in the earlier episodes of the season. To hide Anderson's pregnancy in the early episodes, the producers disguised it with "very fancy trick angles, trench coats, and scenes where she is seated rather than standing". The two-parter of Carter's "Duane Barry" and Paul Brown's "Ascension" were scripted to culminate in Scully's abduction and the re-opening of the X-Files. Anderson does not feature at all in the following episode "3", as she was giving birth to her daughter at the time of filming.

Casting 
The season introduced the character X, played by Steven Williams, who replaced Deep Throat as Mulder's informant, following Deep Throat's assassination in the first-season finale, "The Erlenmeyer Flask". X was originally intended to be a woman with Natalija Nogulich already cast in the role, but was replaced by Williams as the writers did not believe she had the "right chemistry" with her co-stars. X was written to be different than Deep Throat; Deep Throat had been selfless, while X was intended to be selfish and scared. Nicholas Lea, who had previously appeared in a small part in the season one's "Gender Bender", was cast as Alex Krycek. Krycek was originally intended as a temporary replacement for Scully when she was abducted, but grew into a character who would last seven seasons on the show.

During the production of the season, Duchovny asked Carter "wouldn't it be great if we had like an alien bounty hunter?" Carter was positive towards the idea and acted upon it, creating with Spotnitz the character of the Alien Bounty Hunter for the two-part episodes "Colony" and "End Game". Actor Brian Thompson auditioned for the role in a casting session, where he was competing with another actor. Spotnitz and Carter did not have much time to cast the character, but they knew this casting would be important since they intended the character to become a recurring character. Thompson was chosen according to Spotnitz because he had a very "distinctive look" about him, most notably his face and mouth. Megan Leitch also appeared in "Colony" and "End Game" as a grown-up clone version of Samantha Mulder, and would return to play Samantha or one of her clones over the other seasons. Carter did not want it to be the real Samantha, since that would have been "straight science fiction" and it was too "ridiculous" to give too many answers. Darren McGavin, star of Kolchak: The Night Stalker, was sought out for the part of Senator Matheson in "Little Green Men" and Mulder's father in "Colony" and "End Game", but the roles went to Raymond J. Barry and Peter Donat respectively, while McGavin agreed to play X-Files founder Arthur Dales in season five.

Crew 
Carter also served as executive producer and showrunner and wrote seven episodes. Co-executive producers and writing team Glen Morgan and James Wong wrote five episodes for their final season as regular writers for the series, although they would both return as consulting producers for part of season four. Supervising producer Howard Gordon wrote five episodes. Frank Spotnitz joined the series, writing two episodes. Cast member David Duchovny collaborated with Carter for two episodes receiving story credit. Glen Morgan's younger brother Darin Morgan joined the series, contributing the story for an episode written by his older brother and James Wong, and writing another script solo. Paul Brown joined the series as a producer and wrote two episodes. Sara B. Charno, another staff writer, wrote two episodes. Vince Gilligan joined the series, writing one episode. Former supervising producer Alex Gansa returned to co-wrote one episode with writing partner Howard Gordon. Chris Ruppenthal returned to write one more freelance episode after last season. Steve De Jarnatt also contributed one freelance episode for the season. Line producer and production manager Joseph Patrick Finn was promoted to producer with this season. Paul Rabwin continued to serve as co-producer for the show.

Producing-directors for the show included Rob Bowman, David Nutter, Kim Manners and co-executive producer R. W. Goodwin, who all directed the most of the season; Bowman with seven, Nutter with five, and Manners and Goodwin each with two. Series creator Chris Carter directed one episode, making his directorial debut, while Daniel Sackheim, Michael Lange, James Contner, James Whitmore, Jr., Michael Vejar, Nick Marck, Stephen Surjik and Win Phelps each directed one episode.

Cast

Main cast 
 David Duchovny as Special Agent Fox Mulder
 Gillian Anderson as Special Agent Dana Scully

a She does not appear in "3".

Recurring cast

Guest cast

Episodes 

Episodes marked with a double dagger are episodes in the series' Alien Mythology arc.

Reception

Ratings 
The second season of The X-Files debuted with "Little Green Men" on September 16, 1994. The episode earned a Nielsen household rating of 10.3, with a 19 share, meaning that roughly 10.3 percent of all television-equipped households, and 19 percent of households watching television, were tuned in to the episode. The episode was viewed by 9.8 million households, an increase from the first season's finale, "The Erlenmeyer Flask", which was viewed by 8.3 million households. "Little Green Men" was, at the time, the highest-rated episode of The X-Files to air. As the season continued, ratings began to grow. The season hit a high with the fifteenth episode, "Fresh Bones", which was viewed by 10.8 million households. The season hit a low with the twenty-first episode, "The Calusari", which was viewed by 7.9 million households and received a rating of 8.3/16. The season finale, "Anasazi", earned a Nielsen rating of 10.1, with an 18 share, and was viewed by 9.6 million households, marking a 13.5 percent increase in households when compared to the previous season finale. The series was ranked as number 63 during the 1994–95 television season, a significant increase in ratings when compared to the first season, which finished at number 111.

Reviews 
The DVD Journal gave the season four out of four stars, calling it a "memorable season". The review highlighted "The Host", "Duane Barry" and "Ascension", the cliffhanger finale "Anasazi", the "unforgettable" "Humbug", and meeting Mulder and Scully's families in "Colony" and "One Breath". IGN gave the season a rating of 9 out of 10, with the reviewer noting it was an improvement upon the first as it had "started to explore a little" and the "evolution of the characters makes the product shine even though the plotlines have begun to seem familiar". Robert Shearman and Lars Pearson, in their book Wanting to Believe: A Critical Guide to The X-Files, Millennium & The Lone Gunmen, rated several episodes across the season highly, awarding five stars out of five to "Little Green Men", "Duane Barry", "One Breath", "Irresistible", "Die Hand Die Verletzt", and "Anasazi". However, several episodes rated poorly, with  "3", "Excelsis Dei", and "The Calusari" being considered particularly poor.

Many critics considered the "Duane Barry"/"Ascension"/"One Breath" story arc to be the best part of the season. Shearman singled out the three-parter as the highlight of the season, noting that the "intimacy" and "sincerity [of] the emotion" of the episodes allowed the mythology of The X-Files to play out for a further seven seasons. Tom Kessenich, in his book Examination: An Unauthorized Look at Seasons 6–9 of the X-Files named the story arc the top episode of The X-Files and wrote, "to this day, this remains the defining moment in the series run. So much sprang forth from this trio of episodes. ... Sensational."

Accolades 
The second season earned the series seven Primetime Emmy Award nominations, including its first for Outstanding Drama Series. The episode "Duane Barry" received four nominations for different categories; CCH Pounder for Outstanding Guest Actress in a Drama Series; Chris Carter for Outstanding Individual Achievement in Writing for a Drama Series; James Coblentz for Outstanding Individual Achievement in Editing for a Series – Single Camera Production; and for Outstanding Individual Achievement in Sound Editing for a Series. Other nominations included John S. Bartley for Outstanding Individual Achievement in Cinematography for a Series for "One Breath" and Stephen Mark for Outstanding Individual Achievement in Editing for a Series – Single Camera Production for "Sleepless". This season would also earn the series its first of three wins for the Golden Globe Award for Best Television Series – Drama.

DVD release

Notes

References

Bibliography

External links 

 

 
1994 American television seasons
1995 American television seasons